Prospect Hill is a mountain located in Central New York Region of New York west of Cherry Valley.

References

Mountains of Otsego County, New York
Mountains of New York (state)